Theodore Curson (June 3, 1935 – November 4, 2012) was an American jazz trumpeter.

Life and career
Curson was born in Philadelphia. He became interested in playing trumpet after watching a newspaper salesman play a silver trumpet. Curson's father, however, wanted him to play alto saxophone like Louis Jordan. When he was ten, he gained his first trumpet.

He attended Granoff School of Music in Philadelphia. At the suggestion of Miles Davis, he moved to New York in 1956. He performed and recorded with Cecil Taylor in the late 1950s and early 1960s. His composition "Tears for Dolphy" has been used in numerous films.   He was featured in a profile on composer Graham Collier in the 1985 Channel 4 documentary 'Hoarded Dreams' 

He was a familiar face in Finland, having performed at the Pori Jazz festival every year since it began in 1966. In 2007, he performed at Finland's Independence Day Ball at the invitation of president Tarja Halonen.

A longtime resident of Montclair, New Jersey, Curson died from a heart attack in the township on November 4, 2012.

Discography

As leader
 Plenty of Horn (Old Town, 1961)
 Ted Curson Plays Fire Down Below (Prestige, 1963)
 Live at La'Tete De L'Art (Trans-World, 1962)
 Tears for Dolphy (Fontana, 1965)
 The New Thing & the Blue Thing (Atlantic, 1965)
 Urge (Fontana, 1966)
 Ode to Booker Ervin (Columbia, 1970)
 Pop Wine (Futura, 1971)
 Cattin' Curson (Marge, 1975)
 Blue Piccolo (Whynot, 1976)
 Jubilant Power (Inner City, 1976)
 Quicksand (Atlantic, 1977)
 Flip Top (Arista/Freedom, 1977)
 Fireball (Trio, 1979)
 Blowin' Away with Dizzy Reece (Interplay, 1978)
 The Trio (Interplay, 1979)
 I Heard Mingus (Trio, 1980)
 Snake Johnson (Chiaroscuro, 1981)
 Traveling On (Evidence, 1997)

As sideman
With Bill Barron
 The Tenor Stylings of Bill Barron (Savoy, 1961)
 Modern Windows (Savoy, 1962)
 Now, Hear This! (Audio Fidelity, 1964)

With Charles Mingus
 Mingus (Candid, 1961)
 Charles Mingus Presents Charles Mingus (Candid, 1961)
 Mingus Revisited (Limelight, 1965)
 Mingus at Antibes (Atlantic, 1976)

With Cecil Taylor
 Love for Sale (United Artists, 1959)
 Into the Hot (Impulse!, 1962)
 In Transition (Blue Note, 1975)
 The New Breed (ABC Impulse!, 1978) (reissue of tracks from Into the Hot)

With others
 Pepper Adams, California Cookin' (Interplay, 1991)
 Ran Blake, Film Noir (Arista Novus, 1980)
 Nick Brignola, Baritone Madness (Bee Hive, 1978)
 Bill Dixon & Archie Shepp, Bill Dixon 7-tette/Archie Shepp and the New York Contemporary 5 (Savoy, 1964)
 Graham Collier, Hoarded Dreams (Cuneiform, 2007)
 Eric Dolphy, Candid, Dolphy (Candid, 1989)
 Eric Dolphy, Outward Bound (Poll Winners, 2011)
 Gil Evans, Into The Hot (Impulse!, 1962)
 Andrew Hill, Spiral (Arista/Freedom, 1975)
 Karin Krog, Joy (Meantime, 2008)
 Teo Macero, Impressions of Charles Mingus (Palo Alto, 1983)
 Misha Mengelberg & Piet Noordijk, Journey (MCN, 2011)
 Mark Murphy, Living Room (Muse, 1986)
 Sal Nistico, Neo/Nistico (Bee Hive, 1978)
 Archie Shepp, Fire Music  (Impulse!, 1965)
 Archie Shepp, Quartet (FreeFactory, 2009)
 Andrzej Trzaskowski, Seant (1966)

References

External links 
 

1935 births
2012 deaths
American jazz trumpeters
American male trumpeters
Atlantic Records artists
Bebop trumpeters
Chiaroscuro Records artists
Freedom Records artists
Hard bop trumpeters
India Navigation artists
Mainstream jazz trumpeters
American male jazz musicians
Jazz musicians from New Jersey
Musicians from Philadelphia
Prestige Records artists
People from Montclair, New Jersey
Jazz musicians from Pennsylvania
New York Contemporary Five members
20th-century trumpeters
20th-century American musicians
20th-century American male musicians
21st-century trumpeters
21st-century American musicians
21st-century American male musicians